Skin is a 2018 American biographical drama film written and directed by Israeli-born filmmaker Guy Nattiv. The film stars Jamie Bell, Danielle Macdonald, Daniel Henshall, Bill Camp, Louisa Krause, Zoe Colletti, Kylie Rogers, Colbi Gannett, Mike Colter, and Vera Farmiga. The film is inspired by the true story of an American neo-Nazi skinhead named Bryon Widner.

Skin had its world premiere at the 2018 Toronto International Film Festival on September 8, 2018 and was released on June 27, 2019 through DirecTV Cinema before a wide release on July 26, 2019 by A24.

Plot 

After a recent incident, which involves the burning of a mosque in his hometown, disillusioned Neo-Nazi skinhead Bryon Widner (Jamie Bell) decides to leave the white supremacist movement. He marries a local resident Julie Price (Danielle Macdonald) and begins to work odd jobs alongside undocumented workers, who begin to accept him due to his decision to stop being a racist.

White supremacist members retaliate by shooting out his home with him and a pregnant Julie inside, but both are unharmed. When Bryon steps out to confront them, he sees his dog hanging from a tree. To prevent the supremacists from doing further harm to his family, Bryon meets with political activist Daryle Lamont Jenkins (Mike Colter) and FBI agent Marks (Mary Stuart Masterson). Using information Bryon has provided them, the FBI raids the white supremacist compound. Krager (Bill Camp), one of the supremacists, is arrested.

In the aftermath of the supremacist raid, Jenkins continues heading the One People's Project and remains good friends with Bryon. Bryon himself undergoes two years of surgeries to have all his face and hand tattoos removed. He works on getting a degree in criminal psychology and speaks around the country about tolerance and inclusion from his own experience.

Cast
 Jamie Bell as Bryon "Pitbull" Widner
 Tyler Williamson as young Bryon Widner
 Vera Farmiga as Shareen Krager
 Danielle Macdonald as Julie Price
 Mike Colter as Daryle Lamont Jenkins
 Bill Camp as Fred "Hammer" Krager
 Mary Stuart Masterson as Jackie Marks
 Daniel Henshall as Slayer
 Ari Barkan as Bulldog
 Justin Wilson as Mike
 Scott Thomas as Sean
 Michael Villar as Jerry
 Rob Figueroa as Prophet
 Russel Posner as Gavin
 Louisa Krause as April
 Zoe Colletti as Desiree
 Kylie Rogers as Sierra
 Colbi Gannett as Iggy
 Jaime Ray Newman as Nurse Melissa Frye
 Jenna Leigh Green as Rebecca Ramos

Production

On May 11, 2017, international rights to Skin was bought by Seville International at the 70th Cannes Film Festival. In August 2018, it was reported that composer Dan Romer would be scoring the music for the feature.

In May 2017, it was announced that Jamie Bell and Danielle Macdonald would star in the film, with Nattiv writing the screenplay, producing and directing. In March 2018, after production on the film had started, Vera Farmiga was announced to have joined the cast of the film, with Nattiv's wife Jaime Ray Newman reported to be producing. That same month, Mike Colter was cast as Daryle Lamont Jenkins, founder of the One People's Project. Shortly thereafter, actors Ari Barkan, Scott Thomas, Daniel Henshall, Michael Villar, Justin Wilson, and Russel Posner joined the cast.

Principal photography began in January 2018 in Kingston, New York, and was completed in March 2018.

Release
Skin had its world premiere at the Toronto International Film Festival on September 8, 2018. Shortly after, A24 and DirecTV Cinema acquired distribution rights to the film. It was released through DirecTV Cinema on June 27, 2019, and had a limited release on July 26, 2019.

Critical reception
The site's consensus reads: "Skin could stand to go a bit deeper below its surface, but a worthy story and a committed performance from Jamie Bell make this timely drama well worth a watch." On Metacritic, the film holds a rating of 58 out of 100, based on 20 critics, indicating "mixed or average  reviews".

See also
 Erasing Hate (2011), a documentary film directed by Bill Brummel, covers the life of Bryon Widner.

References

External links
 

2018 films
2018 biographical drama films
2018 drama films
A24 (company) films
American biographical drama films
Drama films based on actual events
Films about neo-Nazis
Films about racism
Films produced by Trudie Styler
Films scored by Dan Romer
Films shot in New York (state)
Neo-Nazism in the United States
Skinhead films
2010s English-language films
2010s American films